The Peloncillo Mountains of Cochise County (Spanish language pelo, hair, pelon, hairless, bald; peloncillo, Little Baldy) is a mountain range in northeast Cochise County, Arizona. A northern north–south stretch of the range extends to the southern region of Greenlee County on the northeast, and a southeast region of Graham County on the northwest. The north stretch of the Peloncillo's forms the border between the two counties. It lies east and northeast of the Willcox Playa, and the San Simon Valley.

The range lies in a region of southeast Arizona and southwest New Mexico called the Madrean Sky Islands.

Description
The north section is oriented north–south, and is bordered on the north by the Gila River which flows west-northwesterly from western New Mexico. The Whitlock Valley and Whitlock Mountains border to the west.

The southern section of the range is a northwest by southeast region, and contains the Peloncillo Mountains Wilderness. Midway Peak is just west of the northern part of the wilderness and is surrounded by it: center-north, northeast, east, and southeast. For the southern part of the wilderness, Gold Hill is just west with an access route through the canyon between; south of the wilderness lies Roostercomb.

Other peaks in the southern region of the Peloncillo Mountains from north to south are, Mount Rayburne, Winchester Peak, San Simon Peak, Engine Mountain, Gold Hill, and Roostercomb.

See also
 List of Madrean Sky Island mountain ranges - Sonoran - Chihuahuan Deserts
 List of mountain ranges of Arizona

References

External links
 Peloncillo Mountains Wilderness BLM
 Midway Peak (Arizona), Peloncillo Mountains, mountainzone, (coordinates)
 The Chiricahua-Peloncillo Region
 Chiricahua-Peloncillo Region Maps: Black Hills, Peloncillo Mountains, etc.

Mountain ranges of Cochise County, Arizona
Mountain ranges of Graham County, Arizona
Mountain ranges of Greenlee County, Arizona
Madrean Sky Islands mountain ranges
Mountain ranges of Arizona